Farhad Sadeghi Amini (فرهاد صادقی امینی in Persian), born in Isfahan, Iran, 1963 is an Iranian painter.

Awards and recognitions
 2008, Mayor of Wellington New Zealand
 2005, Letter of Appreciation, from Culture Heritage, Handicrafts Industry &Tourism Org
 2005, Assumption University in Thailand
 2002, Saadi Shiraz Foundation in Tirana Albania
 2002, Silk Road Festival in Pakistan Kashmir

Exhibitions
 2017-DiverCity exhibition at the Deer Lake Gallery
 2017 Artexpo New York APRIL 21–24, 2017 | PIER 94
 2017 Luminescence Exhibition Hosted by Deer Lake Gallery
 2016- le soleil fine art Gallery Vancouver
 2013-14, North Vancouver Crawl at Supernal Arts Academy 
 2014, Burnaby Art Council Director’s 2008
 2010, Tehran, Art expo of Tehran.
 .2008, Wellington, Individual Exhibition in New Zealand, Academy of Fine Arts Galleries
 2008, Tehran, Art expo of Tehran.
 2008, Wellington, Individual Exhibition in New Zealand, Academy of Fine Arts Galleries
 2008, Tehran Art expo,
 2007, Almaty, Individual Exhibition in Kazakhstan, Kastenlauf National Museum
 2006, Ankara, Individual Exhibition in Turkey
 2005, Dubai, Individual Exhibition in Dubai trade center
 2004, Tehran, Nature from the view of an oriental painter in Academy of arts (Bagh-e-Saba)
 2005, Bangkok, Individual Exhibition in Thailand, Four Wings Hotel
 2005, Bangkok, Individual Exhibition in Thailand, Fine Arts University
 2005, Bangkok, Individual Exhibition in Thailand, in intercontinental hotel
 2005, Bangkok, Individual Exhibition in Thailand, in Assumption University
 2003, Albania Individual Exhibition in Dores Art Hall
 2002, Albania, Tirana, Individual Exhibition in Albania Tirana in History Museum and in Dores
 2002, Tehran, Biennial of painting in Contemporary Art Museum
 2002, Pakistan Gilgit, Individual Exhibitionin Pakistan
 2002, Turkey, Islamabad, Individual Exhibition in Pakistan, Lok Virsa Museum
 2002, Tehran, Group exhibition in Dorsa gallery
 2002, Canada Toronto, Individual Exhibition in Canada Science Centre
 2002, Canada, Toronto, Individual Exhibition, Parvizy Gallery
 2001, Tehran, Individual exhibition in Dorsa gallery
 2000, Tehran, Biennial of Iranian painting in Contemporary Art Museum
 1999, Dubai, Group Exhibition in Dubai trade center
 1999, Tehran, Group exhibition in Dorsa gallery
 1999, Bosnia, Individual Exhibition in Bosnia in central art gallery
 1999, Tehran, Individual exhibition in Dorsa gallery
 1999, Tehran, Individual exhibition in Teheran gallery
 1999, Bosnia-Herzegovina Central Art Museum
 1998, Dubai, Group Exhibition in Dubai trade center
 1997, Dubai, Individual Exhibition in Dubai trade center
 1996, Dubai, Individual Exhibition in Dubai trade center (December)
 1996, Dubai, Individual Exhibition in Dubai trade center (September)
 1993, Tehran, International exhibition of fine arts.
 1978, Isfahan, Group Exhibition in high school of Fine Arts
 1987, Tehran, Group exhibition in fine arts department, University of Tehran
 1986, Tehran, Experience painters
 1985, Tehran, Individual Exhibition

Publications
 1999, Learning to Draw (elementary) Published by Reyhaneh Publication
 2001, Learning to Draw (advanced) Published by Reyhaneh Publication
 2001, Learning to Draw Published by Reyhaneh Publication

Licenses and Certificates

 Applying and designing fine arts programs   for PTIB and have got approval from PTIB in British Columbia for Supernal Arts Academy & Canadian Arts & Sciences Academy 
 Design of  the curriculums for a fine art diploma/Illustration included 8 courses as 6 month program and /two month programs as a Painting1,2,3 and/Drawing1,2,3 	                                                                                      
 Juror of international film Burnaby Film Forum at Burnaby Arts Council(BAC)                                    2016
 Panel of public forum sponsored by B.A at Shadbolt Center                                                                    2016
 Member of art Gallery advocacy at Burnaby Arts Council(BAC)                                                            2013-2017 
 Vice president of CARFAC,B.C                                                                                                 	   2017-2018   
 Director of Board at Burnaby Arts Council	
 Member of Scientific-Specialty Committee of Visual Arts International Kharazmy Festival
 Member of Board of University Applied-Comprehensive University
 Management of Dorsa Art Gallery
 Management of Dorsa Fine arts institute

Academic Records
 1980, Fine arts school, Painting
 1990, Bachelor's degree, Fine arts, Tehran University, painting.
 2000, Master's degree, Fine arts, Shahed University, painting.

Teaching Activity
 Oppenheimer Community Art Show -  Painting Workshops                                                                                   2018	
 Teaching at Shadbolt Center Portrait painting/-Fantasy painting-Meditative art Portrait painting.                                     2016-2018
 Teaching drawing, painting and illustration university level courses at Canadian Arts & sciences Inst.                               2015-2017
 Teaching drawing, painting and illustration university level courses at Supernal Arts Inst.                                         2012-2015                                                                                         
 From 1994 till now, in Fine arts universities.
 From 1994 to 2008, teaching in Science and Culture University.
 From 2008 to 2009, teaching in Kashan university, Faculty of handy craft and architecture.

Accreditation
 From 2005 to 2009, member of Scientific-Specialty Committee of Visual Arts International Kharazmy  (Section of Student and associate degree Student).
 From 2005 to 2009 member of Board of University Applied-Comprehensive University .

External links
 Farhad Sadeghi Amini Official Website
 Wikipedia List of Iranian painters
 Bablearte Gallery
 Qoqnoos Gallery Portfolio
 GS Arts Online Gallery
 Saatchi Online Gallery
 Online gallery
 Iranian Fine Arts Academy

Iranian painters
Living people
1963 births